Cyclocorus lineatus, commonly known as Reinhardt's lined snake, is a species of snake in the family Cyclocoridae. It is endemic to the Philippines.

Subspecies
Two subspecies are recognized:
 Cyclocorus lineatus alcalai Leviton, 1967
 Cyclocorus lineatus lineatus (Reinhardt, 1843)

References 

Lamprophiidae
Snakes of Asia
Reptiles of the Philippines
Endemic fauna of the Philippines
Reptiles described in 1843